Gésio Amadeu (14 June 1947 – 5 August 2020) was a Brazilian actor.

Death
Amadeu died from COVID-19 in São Paulo on 5 August 2020, during the COVID-19 pandemic in Brazil. He was treated for hypertension problems and contracted COVID-19 at a hospital.

Filmography

References

1947 births
2020 deaths
Brazilian actors
Afro-Brazilian people
Deaths from the COVID-19 pandemic in São Paulo (state)